Richard Savery (by 1503 – 4 February 1572), of Totnes and Staverton, Devon, was an English politician.

He was a Member of Parliament (MP) of the Parliament of England for Totnes in November 1554.

References

1572 deaths
English MPs 1554–1555
Members of the Parliament of England (pre-1707) for Totnes
1503 births